Adam Mania (born August 31, 1983 in Hickman, Nebraska) is a swimmer who competed in the 2004 Summer Olympics in Athens, Greece for Poland. In 2006, he switched allegiance to the United States. He grew up in Hickman, Nebraska, where he attended Norris School District 160 and swam for Beatrice High School.

He was initially trained at Country Kids Swim Team in Bennett, Nebraska.

He swam for the University of Wisconsin–Madison, where he was a Big-10 champion in the 400 freestyle relay, and a 13-time All-American. He was the University of Wisconsin–Madison school record holder in the 100 backstroke, 200 backstroke, 200 breaststroke, and 200 individual medley. He was the U.S. National Champion in 2006 in the 100 backstroke and 200 individual medley in the meet held in Federal Way, Washington. In 2010 Mania was also part of his team's national championship 4 x 100 LCM Freestyle Relay, giving him his third U.S. national title.

Currently he is a coach and swimmer for Schroeder YMCA Swim Team in Brown Deer, Wisconsin and coached by Dave Anderson. His main training partner for the 2012 Olympic trials was Kevin Ewald.

His parents are Genowefa Szczerbowska and Zbigniew Mania.

References

External links 
 
 
 

American male swimmers
Polish male backstroke swimmers
Polish male medley swimmers
1983 births
Swimmers at the 2004 Summer Olympics
Olympic swimmers of Poland
People from Lancaster County, Nebraska
Living people
Wisconsin Badgers men's swimmers
Polish male breaststroke swimmers
21st-century Polish people
21st-century American people